In physics, the no-deleting theorem of quantum information theory is a no-go theorem which states that, in general, given two copies of some arbitrary quantum state, it is impossible to delete one of the copies. It is a time-reversed dual to the no-cloning theorem, which states that arbitrary states cannot be copied.  This theorem seems remarkable, because, in many senses, quantum states are fragile; the theorem asserts that, in a particular case, they are also robust. Physicist Arun K. Pati along with  Samuel L. Braunstein proved this theorem.

The no-deleting theorem, together with the no-cloning theorem, underpin the interpretation of quantum mechanics in terms of category theory, and, in particular, as a dagger symmetric monoidal category. This formulation, known as categorical quantum mechanics, in turn allows a connection to be made from quantum mechanics to linear logic as the logic of quantum information theory (in exact analogy to classical logic being founded on Cartesian closed categories).

Overview of quantum deletion
Suppose that there are two copies of an unknown quantum state. A pertinent question in this context is to ask if it is possible, given two identical copies, to delete one of them using quantum mechanical operations? It turns out that one cannot. The no-deleting theorem is a consequence of linearity of quantum mechanics. Like the no-cloning theorem this has important implications in quantum computing, quantum information theory and quantum mechanics in general.

The process of quantum deleting takes two copies of an arbitrary, unknown 
quantum state at the input port and outputs a blank state along with the original. Mathematically, 
this can be described by:

where  is the deleting operation which is not necessarily unitary (but a linear operator),  is the unknown quantum 
state,  is the blank state,  is the initial state of 

It may be noted that classical bits can be copied and deleted, as can qubits in orthogonal states. In this case we have deleted the second copy. However, it follows from linearity of quantum theory that there is no  that can perform the deleting operation for any arbitrary state .

Formal statement of the no-deleting theorem 

Let  be an unknown quantum state in some Hilbert space (and let other states have their usual meaning). Then, 
there is no linear isometric transformation such that 
, with the final state of the ancilla being independent of
.

Proof 

The theorem holds for quantum states in a Hilbert space of any dimension. For simplicity, 
consider the deleting transformation for two identical qubits. If two qubits are in orthogonal states, then deletion requires that 
,
.

Let  be the state of an unknown qubit.  If we have two copies of an unknown qubit, then by linearity of the deleting transformation we have 

In the above expression, the following transformation has been used: 

However, if we are able to delete a copy, then, at the output port of the deleting machine, the combined state should be 
.

In general, these states are not identical and hence we can say that the machine fails to delete a copy. If we require that the final output states are same, then we will see that there is only one option:

and

This means that the quantum information is simply in the final state of the ancilla. One can always obtain the unknown state from the final state of the ancilla using local operation on the ancilla Hilbert space. Thus, linearity of quantum theory does not allow an unknown quantum state to be deleted perfectly.

Consequence
 If it were possible to delete an unknown quantum state, then, using two pairs of EPR states, we could send signals faster than light. Thus, violation of the no-deleting theorem is inconsistent with the no-signalling condition.
 The no-cloning and the no-deleting theorems point to the conservation of quantum information.
 A stronger version of the no-cloning theorem and the no-deleting theorem provide permanence to quantum information.  To create a copy one must import the information from some part of the universe and to delete a state one needs to export it to another part of the universe where it will continue to exist.

See also
 No-broadcast theorem
 No-cloning theorem
 No-communication theorem
 No-hiding theorem
 Quantum cloning
 Quantum entanglement
 Quantum information
 Quantum teleportation
 Uncertainty principle

References

Quantum information science
Theorems in quantum mechanics
No-go theorems